Peter Hodgkinson is a British sculptor, born 1956 in Preston.

Among his commissions are statues of L S Lowry in Sam's Chop House, off Cross Street, Manchester, and the footballers Tom Finney and Stan Mortensen.

References

Living people
English sculptors
English male sculptors
Artists from Preston, Lancashire
Modern sculptors
1956 births